Karatay or Karatai is a Turkic word that may refer to:

Places
Karatay, Konya, a town and district of Konya Province, Turkey
Karatay, Russia, a rural locality (a village) in the Republic of Tatarstan, Russia
Caratai, Karatay, historical name of Castelu, Romania, from the times of the Ottoman Empire

People
Qaratays, a Turkic (Tatar) ethnic group that lives near Karatay, Russia
Canan Karatay (born 1943), Turkish professor, medical doctor
Dursun Karatay (born 1984), Austrian footballer
Nefise Karatay (born 1976), Turkish actress
Karatai, birth surname of Maksim Łužanin, Belarusian writer and poet

Turkish-language surnames